Nanitamo Jonathan Ikoné (born 2 May 1998) is a French professional footballer who plays as a forward for Serie A club Fiorentina and the France national team.

Club career

Paris Saint-Germain
Ikone made his professional debut on 28 September 2016 in the UEFA Champions League against Ludogorets replacing Ángel Di María after 88 minutes in a 1–3 away win. He made his Ligue 1 debut three days later against Bordeaux, once again coming on in place of Di María after 88 minutes in a 2–0 home win.

Montpellier (loan)
On 18 January 2017, Ikoné was loaned to fellow Ligue 1 side Montpellier for the rest of the season. He made his debut against Metz three days later and played the whole match.

Lille
On 1 July 2018, Ikoné joined Ligue 1 side Lille on a five-year contract.

Fiorentina 
On 31 December 2021, Ikoné signed for Serie A club Fiorentina, effective from 3 January 2022. The deal was worth a reported €15 million.

International career
Ikoné was born in France and is of DR Congolese descent. He is a youth international footballer for France. He was called up to the senior France squad for games against Albania and Andorra in September 2019. He scored on his debut on 7 September against Albania after coming on as a 77-minute substitute for Kingsley Coman.

Career statistics

Club

International

Honours
Paris Saint-Germain
Trophée des Champions: 2016

Lille
Ligue 1: 2020–21
Trophée des Champions: 2021

France U17
UEFA European Under-17 Championship: 2015

Individual
UEFA European Under-17 Championship Team of the Tournament: 2015

References

External links

 Profile at the ACF Fiorentina website 
 
 
 

1998 births
Living people
Sportspeople from Bondy
French footballers
France youth international footballers
France under-21 international footballers
France international footballers
Association football forwards
Paris Saint-Germain F.C. players
Montpellier HSC players
Lille OSC players
ACF Fiorentina players
Ligue 1 players
Black French sportspeople
French sportspeople of Democratic Republic of the Congo descent
French expatriate footballers
Expatriate footballers in Italy
French expatriate sportspeople in Italy
Footballers from Seine-Saint-Denis
20th-century French people
21st-century French people